Jezerca is a small settlement above the town of Kobarid in the Littoral region of Slovenia.

References

External links
Jezerca on Geopedia

Populated places in the Municipality of Kobarid